The Ministry of Energy and Mining ("Ministry of Energy and Mines") is a ministry of the government of Algeria. The head office is in Tour A in Algiers. As of 2021 Mohamed Arkab is the minister.

References

External links

Ministry of Energy and Mining  (English page is currently under construction)
Ministry of Energy and Mining (Archive)

Energy and Mining
Algeria
Algeria